Pericycos princeps is a species of beetle in the family Cerambycidae. It was described by Francis Polkinghorne Pascoe in 1878. It is known from Malaysia.

Subspecies
 Pericycos princeps flavoapicalis Breuning, 1979
 Pericycos princeps princeps (Pascoe, 1878)

References

Lamiini
Beetles described in 1978